Khvajeh Shamsi (also Romanized as Khvājeh Shamsī) is a village in Howmeh Rural District, in the Central District of Minab County, Hormozgan Province, Iran. At the 2006 census, its population was 144, in 39 families.

References 

Populated places in Minab County